Caroline Manzo (née Laurita; born August 23, 1961) is an American television personality and entrepreneur. She is best known for starring in the reality television series The Real Housewives of New Jersey, and her own spin-off show, Manzo'd with Children.

Career
Manzo first appeared on the first season of Bravo's The Real Housewives of New Jersey in 2009. Her sister, Dina Manzo (now Dina Cantin), and sister-in-law, Jacqueline Laurita, were also cast members when the show first aired. Manzo departed The Real Housewives after its fifth season and began filming a spin-off series about her family called Manzo'd with Children. The show premiered on October 5, 2014, on Bravo; it attracted over 1.7 million viewers. In March 2015, Bravo renewed Manzo'd with Children for a second season. In April 2016, it was renewed for a third season. In February 2017, it was announced the series would not return for a fourth season.

Manzo has written a book entitled Let Me Tell You Something which was released on December 1, 2013, by HarperCollins.

Manzo was offered a part-time role on the tenth season of The Real Housewives of New Jersey, but turned it down, finding the offer "insulting". In 2022, Manzo confirmed that she was asked to return for the thirteenth season of The Real Housewives of New Jersey as a full-time housewife, but once again declined the offer.

In January 2023, it was announced that Manzo would appear on the upcoming fourth season of The Real Housewives Ultimate Girls Trip, filming in Morocco.

Personal life
Manzo is married to Albert Manzo, co-owner of The Brownstone, an event and catering facility in Paterson, New Jersey. The couple have three children: Albert "Albie" (b. 1986), Lauren Michele (b. 1988), and Christopher Thomas (b. 1989).

Manzo's husband Albert and his brother, Dina Cantin's ex-husband Tommy Manzo, inherited The Brownstone from their father, Albert "Tiny" Manzo. The Brownstone was used as a location on The Sopranos.

Manzo has been a resident of Franklin Lakes, New Jersey.

Manzo's first grandchild, Marchesa Anna Scalia, was born to her daughter, Lauren, and son-in-law, Vito Scalia (the best friend of Albie Manzo), on February 24, 2017.

References

External links
 

1961 births
Living people
People from Brooklyn
The Real Housewives cast members
American women writers
American writers of Italian descent
People from Franklin Lakes, New Jersey
21st-century American women